Richard Paul Kiley (March 31, 1922 – March 5, 1999) was an American stage, film and television actor and singer. He is best known for his distinguished theatrical career in which he twice won the Tony Award for Best Actor In A Musical. Kiley created the role of Don Quixote in the original 1965 production of the Broadway musical Man of La Mancha  and was the first to sing and record "The Impossible Dream", the hit song from the show. In the 1953 hit musical Kismet, he played the Caliph in the original Broadway cast and, as such, was one of the quartet who sang "And This Is My Beloved". Additionally, he won three Emmy Awards and two Golden Globe Awards during his 50-year career and his "sonorous baritone" was also featured in the narration of a number of documentaries and other films. At the time of his death, Kiley was described as "one of theater's most distinguished and versatile actors" and as "an indispensable actor, the kind of performer who could be called on to play kings and commoners and a diversity of characters in between."

Early life
Kiley was born on March 31, 1922, in Chicago, Illinois, and raised Roman Catholic. He graduated from Mt. Carmel High School in 1939, and after a year at Loyola University Chicago he left to study acting at Chicago's Barnum Dramatic School. In the late 1940s, he performed in Chicago-area summer stock theaters with actors such as Alan Furlan. Following his service in the United States Navy in World War II, he returned to Chicago working as an actor and announcer on radio before moving to New York City. In New York he studied singing with Ray Smolover.

Career
Kiley's work on stage included Kismet, No Strings (which was Richard Rodgers's first stage musical after the death of Oscar Hammerstein II, in which Rodgers wrote both music and lyrics), the Buddy Hackett vehicle I Had a Ball, and the lead roles in Redhead, Man of La Mancha, and the play The Incomparable Max.

Kiley later starred in the television play Patterns, which aired live on January 12, 1955. It caused a sensation and won an Emmy for its writer, Rod Serling. He played the role of John Malcolm Patterson, future Attorney General of Alabama (and later Governor of Alabama), in the 1955 film The Phenix City Story.  Kiley also portrayed math teacher Joshua Edwards, whose phonograph records were smashed by delinquents in Blackboard Jungle in 1955.

Kiley won Tony Awards for Best Actor in a Musical for Redhead in 1959 and Man of La Mancha in 1966. The dual role of middle-aged author Cervantes and his fictional creation Quixote is one of the few musical roles that requires the talents of both leading man and character actor. Kiley said  while La Mancha was on Broadway that despite the fact he had grown tired of playing leading men, he would always be grateful for having been given the chance to perform in La Mancha.  He performed in the original production for over five years and returned for Broadway revivals in 1972 and 1977 saying he had become "very possessive" of the role.

Later years
Kiley won three Emmy Awards and two Golden Globe Awards for his work in television. He won both an Emmy and Golden Globe awards for The Thorn Birds (as Paddy, Rachel Ward's father) (1983) and A Year in the Life (1986, 1987–1988). His third Emmy win was for Guest Actor in a Drama Series, for an episode of Picket Fences, in which he had a recurring role as the father of main character Jimmy Brock (Tom Skerritt). Kiley also received an Emmy nomination for portraying Chief Justice Earl Warren in the 1991 miniseries Separate but Equal dramatizing Brown vs. Board of Education.

Other television work included as the murderous police commissioner on Columbo (1974, the episode "A Friend In Deed"), his appearance as Gideon Seyetik in the Star Trek: Deep Space Nine episode "Second Sight", as well as guest roles on Ally McBeal, Hawaii Five-O and Gunsmoke. He narrated the award-winning seven-part 1986 PBS documentary Planet Earth.

Kiley's baritone made him a favorite to narrate documentaries for television. Starting with ‘Land of the Tiger’ in 1985, Richard Kiley provided narration for multiple National Geographic Video television specials.  

In Jurassic Park, Kiley's voice narrates the park's vehicle tour. Kiley was introduced as the narrator for the tour first in the novel by Michael Crichton and later in the film adaptation by Steven Spielberg where the owner of the park said he "spared no expense" hiring Kiley. Visitors to Universal's Islands of Adventure theme park in Orlando, Florida, and Universal Studios in Hollywood hear Kiley as the narrator of the Jurassic Park River Adventure ride - making him the only person to appear in the book, the film, and the ride.

Kiley also narrated the A&E documentary television series Mysteries of the Bible, from 1994 to 1998. His final acting role was in the 1999 TV movie Blue Moon, which debuted the month after his death.

Death
Kiley died of an unspecified bone marrow disease at Horton Hospital in Middletown, New York, on March 5, 1999, less than a month before his 77th birthday. He was survived by his wife, dancer Patricia Ferrier, and six children from his first marriage: sons David and Michael Kiley and daughters Kathleen, Dorothea, Erin and Deirdre.  His remains were interred in Warwick. Broadway's lights went dark in his honor.

Filmography

Film

Television

Stage

References

Sources 
 Man of La Mancha – original theatrical program, for Kiley's personal comments on playing Don Quixote

External links

 
 
 
 

 Richard Kiley papers, 1939-1999, held by the Billy Rose Theatre Division, New York Public Library for the Performing Arts

1922 births
1999 deaths
Male actors from Chicago
American male film actors
American male musical theatre actors
American male television actors
American male voice actors
Audiobook narrators
Loyola University Chicago alumni
Outstanding Performance by a Lead Actor in a Drama Series Primetime Emmy Award winners
Outstanding Performance by a Supporting Actor in a Miniseries or Movie Primetime Emmy Award winners
Tony Award winners
Best Drama Actor Golden Globe (television) winners
Best Supporting Actor Golden Globe (television) winners
People from Warwick, New York
20th-century American male actors
20th-century American singers
20th-century American male singers
United States Navy personnel of World War II